Wayne E. Whitlatch (9 October 1928 – 26 October 2017) was a retired major general in the United States Air Force who served as commander of the Air Force Test and Evaluation Center from 1980 to 1982.

References

1928 births
2017 deaths
United States Air Force generals